Below are the rosters for the UEFA European Under-16 Football Championship 1997 tournament in Germany.

Group A









Group B









Group C









Group D







http://www.tff.org/Default.aspx?pageID=528&macID=4018

References

UEFA European Under-17 Championship squads